Pteryngium is a genus of silken fungus beetles in the family Cryptophagidae. There is one described species in Pteryngium, P. crenatum.

References

Further reading

 
 
 

Cryptophagidae
Articles created by Qbugbot